The 2013–14 EuroCup Women was the twelfth edition of FIBA Europe's second-tier international competition for women's basketball clubs. It was contested by 28 teams from 11 countries, and started on 6 November 2013.

Teams

Pots
FIBA Europe divided the teams into two conferences based on geographical criteria.

Group stage
The draw took place on 5 July 2013 in Munich, Germany. The teams were divided in seven groups of four teams each. The top two teams and the two best third-placed teams advanced to the Eight-Finals.

Group A

Group B

Group C

Group D

Group E

Group F

Groupe G

Round of 16

Quarterfinals

Semifinals

Final

References

EuroCup Women seasons
2